The Wong–Sandler mixing rule is a thermodynamic mixing rule used for vapor–liquid equilibrium and liquid-liquid equilibrium calculations.


Summary

The first boundary condition is

which constrains the sum of a and b. The second equation is

The mixing rules become

The cross term still must be specified by a combining rule, either

or

See also
Vapor–liquid equilibrium
Equation of state

References

Engineering thermodynamics
Thermodynamics
Equilibrium chemistry